Georg Fischer may refer to:
 Georg Fischer (skier), West German cross-country skier and biathlete
 Georg Fischer (politician), German politician
 Georg Fischer (company), a Swiss manufacturing company

See also
 George Fischer (disambiguation)
 George Fisher (disambiguation)